Rýchory (German: [Rehorn / Rehorngebirge]) is a mountain ridge in the Czech Republic lying in the eastern Giant Mountains (Krkonoše). It is the easternmost tip of the Giant Mountains, forming a broad belt of forested ridges from Horní Lysečiny over the Mravenečník (Anteater) hill to the Sklenářovický hill.

Geography 
Rýchory lies on the southeastern edge of Krkonoše. The main ridge is approximately 1.5 km long with the slopes included Rýchory are roughly 6 km long. They lie 4 km southwest from Žacléř, 10 km north of Trutnov and 5 km east from Janské Lázně. The ridge is oriented in northwest-southeast direction. The highest peak is Dvorský les (1033 m), which forms the south-eastern ending of the main ridge and it is the easternmost One-thousander in Krkonoše. The north-western ending is the peak Kutná (1001 m) with Rýchorská bouda mountain chalet. Between these two there are no other important peaks. A short side ridge branches to the south-west with a nameless peak of 1008 m. To the north, the pass Rýchorský kříž divides Rýchory from northward ridge towards the main part of Krkonoše.

Rýchory constitutes the easternmost part of the Krkonoše Mountains National Park and thanks to their highly valuable botanical locations, the upper parts around the main ridge of Rýchory have been included in Zones I and II of the national park. The Dvorský les forest in Rýchory preserves a remaining area of beech primeval forest, consisting of the bizarre trunks of old beech, rowan, birch and spruce trees covered with moss and is a favourite location of nature photographers.

In the northern slopes of the Rýchory ridge and in the valley of Sněžný potok there is a small settlement called Rýchory as well, which forms part of the town Žacléř.

Gold Mining 
Based on legends, written down by chronicler Simon Hüttel of Trutnov, gold was mined on the slopes of Rýchory as early as 11th century, while the most important mines were founded during the reign of Duke Oldřich of Bohemia. First written record of gold mining is from the year 1542. Emperor Ferdinand I granted mining privileges to the market town Svoboda nad Úpou. A gold mining village Sklenářovice was also founded in a southern valley of Rýchory. Largest extent of gold mining came after 1648, when Emperor Ferdinand III confirmed the privileges of Svoboda nad Úpou. Mining was ended in 1742.

The gold of Rýchory is unique in Europe, because it contains palladium, other deposits with similar composition are only in Brazil.

References 

Mountains and hills of the Czech Republic
Trutnov District